QIS College of Engineering and Technology is located in Vengamukkapalem, Ongole, Andhra Pradesh. It was established in 1998 by The Nidamanuri Educational Society. The college is affiliated with JNTU, Kakinada.
"This Is The First Engineering Autonomous College in Prakasam district".

The college offers undergraduate Courses like Bachelor of Technology programmes for mechanical engineering(ME), electrical and electronics engineering(EEE), electronics and communications engineering(ECE), Computer Science and Engineering (CSE), Civil Engineering (CE) and Information Technology(IT).

Also offered are programmes for Master of Technology, Master of Business Administration, and Master in Computer Applications.

References

External links

See also
Pace Institute of Technology and Sciences

All India Council for Technical Education
Engineering colleges in Andhra Pradesh
Engineering colleges in Prakasham District
Educational institutions established in 1998
1998 establishments in Andhra Pradesh